The 2021 Alberta Senate nominee election, formally the 5th Senate Nominee Election, was held in Alberta to help select (non-binding) nominees for appointment to represent Alberta in the Senate of Canada. The Senate election was held on October 18 in conjunction with the 2021 Alberta municipal elections.

Background 

Alberta is the only province to hold elections for nominees to the Senate. These elections, held under Alberta's Senate Election Act, are not binding on the prime minister when he advises the governor general on appointments to the Senate. However, in the previous four senate elections, nine senate nominees have been selected; and, of these, five were appointed to the Senate of Canada.

The act also establishes that the number of Senate nominees is to be set by the Lieutenant Governor-in-Council when issuing the order in council. The current order in council sets the number of senate candidates to be selected as three.

Candidacy requirements 

To be eligible to run as a senate candidate, a person had to be qualified under Section 23 of the Constitution Act (1867) and under Section 7 of the Alberta Senate Election Act. The prospective senate candidate also had to determine if they would be endorsed by a registered provincial party in Alberta or aligned with a federal party in Canada. Eligible, prospective senate candidates had to register under the Elections Finances and Contributions Disclosure Act prior to collecting their nomination signatures. Additionally, signatures could only be collected from between the date of the writ of election and nomination day, with candidates collecting at least 500 valid signatures, from eligible voters, in order to be placed on the ballot. Lastly, a $4,000 deposit had to be provided to Elections Alberta, before September 20, to become a fully nominated candidate.

Senate vacancies 

The Alberta Senate Nominee Election will select three candidates, that may be chosen by the prime minister to fill the current single vacancy in the Senate:

 Senator Grant Mitchell resigned from the Senate on April 24, 2020.
 Senator Elaine McCoy died in December 2020.
Karen Sorenson was appointed to the Senate on July 29, 2021, filling one of the two vacancies.

Electoral system 
The election used block voting, to elect three Senate nominees.

Prospective candidates 
, several prospective senate candidates had filed nomination papers with Elections Alberta. There were enough prospective candidates nominated that the ballot was not acclaimed.

Results

By candidate
Official poll results as per report posted by Elections Alberta:

By party

See also 

 Alberta Senate nominee elections
Elections Alberta

References 

Alberta Senate
Elections in Alberta
2021 in Alberta
Canadian senators-in-waiting from Alberta